Restoration Quarterly is a scholarly journal associated with the Churches of Christ. It focuses on issues of interest to the Churches of Christ and other groups associated with the Restoration Movement more generally.

History
The journal was established in 1957 by Abraham J. Malharbe and Pat E. Harrell. It gained recognition outside the Churches of Christ under the leadership of Thomas H. Olbricht, who was editor from 1973 through 1987. Since 1993, it has been edited by James W. Thompson. The journal is informally associated with Abilene Christian University through shared staff and other assistance offered by the university. There are no formal organizational or financial ties between the two, however.

Contents
The Quarterly has "reflected a maturing of theological scholarship especially in Churches of Christ." It has also published articles from other branches of the Restoration Movement and from outside the movement. Most of the articles have focused on biblical studies and the history of the Restoration Movement.

References

External links
 

Restoration Movement
Churches of Christ
Christian magazines
Christianity studies journals
Publications established in 1957
Quarterly journals